One Silver Piece is a 1976 Czechoslovakian drama film directed by Jaroslav Balík. It was selected as the Czechoslovakian entry for the Best Foreign Language Film at the 49th Academy Awards, but was not accepted as a nominee.

Cast
 Anatolij Kuzněcov as Laco Tatar (as Anatolij Kuznecov)
 Emil Horváth as Martin Uher
 Július Vasek as Gabor
 Ferdinand Kruta as Matej Korínek
 Miroslav Moravec as Forman

See also
 List of submissions to the 49th Academy Awards for Best Foreign Language Film
 List of Czechoslovak submissions for the Academy Award for Best Foreign Language Film

References

External links
 

1976 films
Czechoslovak drama films
1970s Czech-language films
1976 drama films
Films directed by Jaroslav Balík
Czech drama films
1970s Czech films